Salie is a surname. Notable people with the surname include:

Faith Salie (born 1971), American journalist, writer, actress, comedian, television, radio host and Rhodes scholar
Tawfeeq Salie (born 1991), South African footballer

See also
Sale (surname)